Robyn Moore (born 15 September 1960) is a British actress, best known for playing Shirley Benson in EastEnders from 2003 to 2004.

She is the daughter of actor Stephen Moore and the niece of actor James Hazeldine. Her cousins, Sam and Angela Hazeldine, are also actors. She found out that she had gotten the part of Shirley on the day of her uncle James's funeral.

Moore has also appeared in Agatha Christie's Poirot, Family Affairs, The Bill and Doctors.

In November 2008, she began a month-long run at the White Bear Theatre in Kennington, in the new Australian play The Ides of March.

References

External links 
 

1960 births
Living people
British soap opera actresses
British television actresses